Isbania, also Isibania, is a town in Migori County of Kenya, at the International border with Tanzania.

Location
The coordinates of the town are: 1°14'32.0"S, 34°28'36.0"E (Latitude:-1.242219; Longitude:34.476672).

Overview 
The town is the southern end of the Isebania–Kisii–Ahero Road. In addition to the highway, other roads in the town are being tarmacked.

See also
 List of roads in Kenya
 Isebania, Tanzania

References

External links 
Webpage of the East African Community
Welcome to Isebania

Populated places in Migori County
Kenya–Tanzania border crossings